The silky short-tailed bat (Carollia brevicauda) is a bat species found in Bolivia, Brazil, Colombia, Ecuador, French Guiana, Guyana, Panama, Peru, Suriname, Mexico and Venezuela.

Its diet consists primarily of fruits, but opportunistically it will glean leaves for insects, supplemented by nectar in the dry season. It is one of the most important seed dispersers for pipers and small fruits in the area which it resides.

References

Bats of South America
Bats of Brazil
Mammals of Colombia
Bats of Central America
Mammals described in 1821
Carollia